Ian Robert Whitting  (born 2 April 1953) is a British diplomat who was Ambassador to Montenegro from 2013 to 2017 and Ambassador to Iceland from 2008 to 2012.

Career
Whitting was educated at Chichester High School For Boys and joined the Foreign and Commonwealth Office (FCO) in 1972. Between posts at the FCO, he served at Moscow, Tunis, Athens, Dublin and Abidjan. He returned to the embassy at Athens as 
Director, EU and Economic Affairs, from 2003 to 2004 and Deputy Head of Mission and Consul General from 2005 to 2008. He was then appointed Ambassador to Iceland, an office he served in from 2008 to 2012, and took up his appointment as Ambassador to Montenegro in September 2013. In March 2017 the FCO announced that he was to transfer to another Diplomatic Service appointment.

Personal life
Whitting is married to Tracy (née Gallagher). They have two daughters, Olivia and Isobel.

References
Mr Ian Whitting OBE, gov.uk
WHITTING, Ian Robert, Who's Who 2013, A & C Black, 2013; online edn, Oxford University Press, Dec 2012
Mr Ian Whitting, OBE, Debrett's People of Today

1953 births
Living people
Ambassadors of the United Kingdom to Iceland
Ambassadors of the United Kingdom to Montenegro
Officers of the Order of the British Empire